The Episcopal Diocese of the Virgin Islands is a diocese of the Episcopal Church in the United States of America (ECUSA) which includes both the United States Virgin Islands and the British Virgin Islands. The diocese is a part of Province II of the Episcopal Church. The current Diocesan Bishop of the Virgin Islands is the  Edward Ambrose Gumbs. The cathedral church of the diocese is the Cathedral Church of All  Saints, Charlotte Amalie. The diocese currently comprises 14 churches. There is a functioning parish school on St. Thomas All Saints Cathedral School there was an academic campus on St. Croix, St. Dunstan's Episcopal High School.   St. Dunstan's closed in the 1990s. There is also the St. Georges School located on the parish property of St. Georges Episcopal Church in Road Town, Tortola in the British Virgin Islands, which also opened the St. Georges School (Secondary Division) in Palestina Estate near to the St. Paul's Episcopal Church in Sea Cow's Bay, Tortola in the British Virgin Islands. There is also the St. Mary's School located on the parish property of the St. Mary's Episcopal Church in Valley, Virgin Gorda in the British Virgin Islands.

History
In 1917 when the United States bought the Danish West Indies from Denmark, the three Anglican parishes and one mission on the islands were under the Anglican Bishop of Antigua
who was part of the Diocese of Barbados. On the transfer of the U.S. Virgin Islands from Danish to American Sovereignty, the Bishop of Antigua, on 30 April 1919 transferred the ecclesiastical jurisdiction of the Churches of the Anglican Communion in those islands to the Protestant Episcopal Church in the United States of America. The House of Bishops, assembled at Winston-Salem, North Carolina, did on 7 November 1947 erect the Anglican Churches in the Virgin Islands to the status of the Missionary District, to be known as the Missionary District of the Virgin Islands. The Presiding Bishop appointed the Bishop of Puerto Rico as bishop-in-charge of the new mission district. By a Deed of Relinquishment the Archbishop of the West Indies on 24 November 1963 transferred ecclesiastical jurisdiction of the Anglican Churches in the British Virgin Islands to the Protestant Episcopal Church of the United States of America. In 1962 Cedric Mills was appointed Bishop of the Virgin Islands by the House of Bishops and he arrived in 1963 and assumed jurisdiction over all Anglican and Episcopal churches in the wider Virgin Islands. In 1971 the diocese elected its own bishop for the first time.  Edward Mason Turner, rector of St. Paul's in Frederiksted, was elected bishop in November 1971.  He was consecrated bishop in May 1972.

Bishops of the Diocese
The Bishops of the Diocese are:
1. Cedric E. Mills (1962–1972);
2. Edward M. Turner (1972–1985);
  Interim Bishop: Richard M. Martin (1985–1986);
3  E. Don Taylor, elected by the Bishops of Province II, (1986–1994)
  Interim Bishop: Telésforo A. Isaac (1994–1997);
4. Theodore A. Daniels (1997–2003);
  Interim Bishop: Telésforo A. Isaac (2004–2005); and
5. Edward Ambrose Gumbs (2005–present).

Deaneries
In accordance with the usage in the ECUSA, the diocese is divided into three deaneries each headed by a regional dean and named as follows:
 1. St. Thomas-St. John Deanery;
 2. St. Croix Deanery; and
 3. Virgin Islands (British) Deanery.

See also

Episcopal Church in the United States of America
Christianity
Anglican Communion
All Saints Cathedral School

References

External links
 
 Anglican Communion listing for diocese
 The Episcopal Church in the United States of America

Virgin Islands
Christianity in the British Virgin Islands
Christianity in the United States Virgin Islands
United States Virgin Islands
Christian organizations established in 1962
1962 establishments in North America
1960s establishments in the Caribbean
Province 2 of the Episcopal Church (United States)